The 1995 Kyrgyzstan League is the 4th season of Kyrgyzstan League, the Football Federation of Kyrgyz Republic's top division of association football. Kant Oil Kant retained the league that they won in the previous season. Sixteen teams participated in the 1995 season.

The league was divided in two zones of eight teams, Zone A and Zone B, with the top four teams in each zone qualifying for the championship playoffs. The bottom four teams in each zone entered the promotion/relegation playoff.
There they were joined by eight teams from the lower division. This was divided into a northern and southern zone. The northern zone was played, but not the southern zone.

From this northern zone promotion/relegation play-off, three teams were promoted to the top level division for the 1996 season: Rotor Bishkek, Dinamo Bishkek and KVT Khimik Kara Balta.

First stage

Zone A

Zone B

Second stage

Championship play Off

Promotion/relegation play Off: Northern Zone

References
Kyrgyzstan - List of final tables (RSSSF)
Kyrgyzstan - the 1995 details (RSSSF)

Kyrgyzstan League seasons
1
Kyrgyzstan
Kyrgyzstan